Qezeljeh-ye Sofla may refer to:
 Qezeljeh-ye Sofla, West Azerbaijan
 Qezeljeh-ye Sofla, Zanjan